Kally Agogo (born 9 September, 1956) is a Nigerian wrestler. He competed in the 1984 Summer Olympics.

References

External links
 

1956 births
Living people
Wrestlers at the 1984 Summer Olympics
Nigerian male sport wrestlers
Olympic wrestlers of Nigeria
20th-century Nigerian people